Dobriana Rabadzhieva (Bulgarian Cyrillic: Добриана Рабаджиева, born 14 June 1991 in Godlevo, Blagoevgrad Province) is an international volleyball player from Bulgaria.

Career

She began her career with CSKA Sofia. Rabadzhieva won the silver medal in the 2012 FIVB Club World Championship, playing with the Azerbaijani club Rabita Baku.

After the conclusion of the 2012 Women's European Volleyball League, during which Rabadzhieva was a prominent part of the Bulgaria women's national team that finished in second place, she won the best server award.

On 18 June 2013 Rabadzhieva signed a contract with Galatasaray Daikin. On 4 June 2014 Rabadzhieva continues her career with The Swiss champions Volero Zurich.

Rabadzhieva won the bronze medal at the 2015 FIVB Club World Championship, playing with the Swiss club Voléro Zürich.

Since the late 2010s  Rabadzhieva has not featured for the national team due to personal differences with the national federation.

Clubs
 VC CSKA Sofia (2005–2010)
 Imoco Conegliano (2010–2011)
 Rabita Baku (2011–2013)
 Galatasaray Daikin (2013–2014)
 Voléro Zürich (2014–2017)
 Galatasaray (2017–2018)
 Guangdong Evergrande (2018–2020)
 Itambé/Minas (2020)
 Guangdong Evergrande (2020)
 Roma Volley Club (2021–2022)
 Shandong (2022)
 Dynamo-Ak Bars Kazan (2023–)

Awards

Clubs
 2011 FIVB Club World Championship -  Gold medal Champion, with  Rabita Baku
 2011-12 Azerbaijan League -  Champion, with Rabita Baku
 2011-12 Azerbaijan Cup -  Champion, with Rabita Baku
 2012 FIVB Club World Championship -  Silver medal, with Rabita Baku
 2012-13 Azerbaijan League -  Champion, with Rabita Baku
 2012–13 CEV Champions League -  Silver medal, with Rabita Baku
 2014–15 Swiss cup -  Champion, with Volero Zurich
 2014–15 Swiss league -  Champion, with Volero Zurich
 2015 FIVB Club World Championship -   Bronze medal, with Volero Zurich
 2017 FIVB Club World Championship -   Bronze medal, with Volero Zurich
 2020 South American Club Championship –  Champion, with Itambé/Minas

National team
 2009 Junior Balkan Championship -  Gold medal
 2012 Women's European Volleyball League -  Silver medal
 2013 Women's European Volleyball League -  Bronze medal
 2014 Boris Yeltsin Cup 2014 -  Gold medal

References

External links
 

1991 births
Living people
Bulgarian women's volleyball players
People from Blagoevgrad Province
Galatasaray S.K. (women's volleyball) players
European Games competitors for Bulgaria
Volleyball players at the 2015 European Games
Bulgarian expatriate sportspeople in Switzerland
Bulgarian expatriates in Italy
Bulgarian expatriate sportspeople in Azerbaijan
Bulgarian expatriate sportspeople in Turkey
Outside hitters
Expatriate volleyball players in Switzerland
Expatriate volleyball players in Brazil
Expatriate volleyball players in Italy
Expatriate volleyball players in Azerbaijan
Expatriate volleyball players in Turkey
Sportspeople from Blagoevgrad Province
20th-century Bulgarian women
21st-century Bulgarian women